Neufchâteau-Virton was a parliamentary constituency in Belgium used to elect members of the Walloon Parliament from 1995 until 2019. It corresponds to the arrondissements of Neufchâteau and Virton.

A January 2018 decree merged both Luxembourg constituencies (Neufchâteau-Virton and Arlon-Marche-Bastogne) into one.

Representatives

References

Constituencies of the Parliament of Wallonia